Rajkumar Barjatya also known as Raj Kumar Barjatya was an Indian film producer. He was part of the Barjatya family which founded Rajshri Productions. He is best known for producing the blockbuster Bollywood films Maine Pyar Kiya and Hum Aapke Hain Koun..! both directed by his son, Sooraj Barjatya who made his debut with the former film. He died on February 21, 2019, after a brief period of hospitalization in Mumbai.

Early life 
Rajkumar Barjatya joined Indian Institute of Technology, Kharagpur in 1962 and chose Mining Engineering. He resided in Rajendra Prasad Hall of Residence. He quit studies in summer of 1962 in order to join Rajshri Productions at the request of his father Tarachand Barjatya.

Filmography

Producer 

Hum Chaar  (2019)
Prem Ratan Dhan Payo (2015)
Jaana Pehchana (2011)
Love U... Mr. Kalakaar! (2011)
Isi Life Mein...! (2010)
Ek Vivaah... Aisa Bhi (2008)
 Shaashu Ghara Chaalijibi (2006)
Vivah (2006)
Main Prem Ki Diwani Hoon (2003)
Hum Pyar Tumhi Se Kar Baithe (2002)
Hum Saath-Saath Hain (1999)
Hum Aapke Hain Koun...! (1994)

Associate Producer 

Maine Pyar Kiya (1989)
Saaransh (1984)
Ek Baar Kaho (1980)
Chitchor (1976)
Tapasya (1976)
Saudagar (1973)
Piya Ka Ghar (1972)

Co-producer 

 Naiyya (1979)

References

External links
 Rajkumar Barjatya on IMDb

2019 deaths
Indian film producers
1943 births